Kurt Boone (born September 24, 1959) is a New York City-based author known for his work documenting street culture, which includes graffiti, urban cycling, street photography, skateboarding, busking, and spoken word.

Early life 
Boone was born in the Bedford–Stuyvesant neighborhood of Brooklyn to Elliott W. Boone Sr., a United States Postal Service employee, and Thelma Boone (née Strothers).

Boone graduated from Andrew Jackson High School in the Cambria Heights neighborhood of Queens in New York City. In high school, Boone was on the track team and basketball team.

Boone attended LaGuardia Community College. He graduated from Los Angeles City College with a degree in business administration.

Career 
Boone started writing poetry in his first year at LaGuardia Community College. He worked as a sports reporter for York College's Pandora Box and Los Angeles City College's Los Angeles Collegian newspapers.

The first book he ever wrote was for the Yale Series of Younger Poet Contest. He did not win but the contest inspired him to write more books.

In 1990, Boone began working as a New York City foot messenger for Rapid Messenger Service. Working as a messenger, delivering and picking up packages either by foot or by bike, was a common occupation for many former high school track stars at that time. Boone is classified as a "metro" messenger, which means he delivers and picks up packages by foot using the New York City Metropolitan Transportation Authority (MTA) service. Metro is short for MTA. Boone became known for being one of the fastest foot messengers in New York City.

While working as a foot messenger and riding the subway on the jobs that are typically less than an hour, Boone writes poetry that is influenced by his travels and encounters with people.

Boone started to become known as a fast courier and talented poet, performing poetry at many New York City events. That eventually led him to produce his first book of poems, Looking For Myself, which was published in 1996. By that time he had left Rapid Messenger Service in 1994.

In addition in the 1990s he was also be a sales representative for the Quarterly Black Review of Books and later a marketing representative for the Harlem Book Fair, a division of QBR. In 2000, he again went back into messenger work, but this time he would document his experiences in books and videos.

Since 2000 in his 12 years as a messenger, he has been reported upon in the media and made the cover of Courier Magazine, with the front headline: "Nobody knows The Gritty Streets of NYC better than Kurt Boone."

Feature stories about Boone have been published in The New York Times, New York Daily News, New York Post and Metro New York. Boone's writing work has also led to opportunities in film and video. He appears in Verse: A Murder Mystery (2011), Career Courier: The Labor Of Love (2011) and produced The Messenger Poet Show (2011), a web television series.

In total, Boone worked at Rapid Messenger Service, Excel Messenger Service, Kangaroo Courier and Mobile Messenger Service – all based in New York City.

Boone's four books of poetry are a loose collection that he calls his messenger poetry series, which documents stories about messengers in verse form, in poetry.

Boone's 2016 book, Subway Beats: Celebrating New York City Buskers, features over 250 musicians in approximately 30 subway stations. It took him over three years to compile and complete the book, which he documented on an online blog.

Boone appeared in Spike Lee's 1992 film, Malcolm X.

Boone cites the author Frank McCourt and playwright Langston Hughes as influences on his work.

Personal life 
Boone lives in the Cambria Heights neighborhood of Queens in New York City.

Boone is known by his foot messenger dispatch name, Messenger 841. It is also the name of an eponymous line of clothing and messenger bags, as well as a consulting company for marketing and film production.

Filmography 
 1992: Malcolm X
 2011: Career Courier: The Labor of Love (documentary)
 2011: VERSE, a Murder Mystery (TV show)

Works and publications 
Books
 
 
 
 
 
 

Poetry
 
 
 
 

Articles

Further reading 
  – Collection of flyers, printouts, postcards, photographs and newspaper clippings pertaining to bicycle messenger Kurt Boone, bicycle messengers, and cycling in New York City in general

References

External links 

 
 
 Subway Beats – blog that compiles much of the work by musicians documented in Subway Beats
 Kurt Boone Collection at New-York Historical Society
 

Living people
1959 births
Writers from Brooklyn
Los Angeles Community College alumni
People from Bedford–Stuyvesant, Brooklyn
Andrew Jackson High School (Queens) alumni